The Al Faridia University is an Deobandi Islamic university situated near the Faisal Mosque in Islamabad, Pakistan. The university was established in 1971 by Maulana Abdullah Ghazi, who remained the Chancellor until he was assassinated by unknown gunmen in October 1998.

As of 2022, it is the largest and oldest Madrasa in Islamabad, and has 1,600 students and more than 95 teachers and is considered one of the leading Islamic educational institutions in Pakistan, and it attracts students from various parts of the country and from other countries as well. The seminary has produced a large number of graduates who have gone on to become prominent Islamic scholars and preachers.

History
In 1966, a small seminary was established at Lal Masjid by Maulana Abdullah Ghazi, in which there were about 20 to 25 students for the Hifz class. After some time, a need was felt to have a bigger place for running this seminary so that a large number of students who were increasing with the passage of time could be accommodated.

Hence, a place in the meadows of the Margalla Hills in Sector E-7 was acquired with the help and cooperation of Seth Haroon E. H. Jaffer (Jaffer Group of Companies), Haji Akhtar Hassan (OSD Kashmir Affairs & Finance Secretary of Azad Kashmir), and Admiral Mohammad. Shariff, NI(M), HJ (Rtd).  The area where the Capital Development Authority built Sector E-7 of Islamabad originally housed several small settlements and the area where Jamia Faridia was specifically constructed had originally been a village by the name of "Dhok Jeevan", which had been inhabited since the rule of the Mughal Empire, and was one of the largest of these settlements and also included the area of (what is now) The Faisal Mosque.

The seminary was relocated to its current building in 1984. Maulana Abdullah Ghazi served as the chancellor until his assassination by unidentified gunmen in the courtyard of Lal Masjid in October 1998.

Following Maulana Abdullah's assassination, his son Maulana Abdul Aziz was appointed as chancellor and his younger brother Maulana Abdul Rashid Ghazi, who was a Quaid-i-Azam University graduate and a former UN envoy, undertook the task of modernizing the institute. As part of this initiative, he launched the Al Faridia Model School, a tuition-free high school that provides classes from 7th grade up until matriculation.

He also introduced short academic programmes including information technology, philosophy and Tajweed (Quranic phonetics).

Academic profile

Etymology

Initially called "Madrasa Arabiya Islamia", the institute underwent a name change when it was relocated to Sector E-7. It was renamed The Faridia School following the recommendation of Seth Haroon E. H. Jaffer. Eventually, it became known as Al Faridia University or Jamia Faridia..

Reputation and rankings

The institute is the largest Islamic seminary/madrasa in Islamabad and the Wifaq ul Madaris ranks the institute among the top 5 madaris/institutes for Islamic learning in Pakistan. It is regarded as one of the most modern madaris.

The institute has hosted several Pakistani and global personalities including Saudi Leader Abdullah Omar Nasseef, Grand Mosque Imam Sheikh Mohammad Al Subail, Pakistani scientist Dr. Abdul Qadeer Khan, and scholars such as Mufti Taqi Usmani, Maulana Zahid Ur Rashdi, Dr. Qibla Ayaz, and Muhammad Hanif Jalandhari.

Academic Degrees

The seminary is recognized for its extensive curriculum, which includes traditional Dars-i Nizami studies, Arabic language, Quranic studies, Islamic jurisprudence, Hadith studies, Islamic history, and other related subjects. Its certificates are issued to students under the Federation of Madaris, and its Dars-i Nizami degree is equivalent to an Master of Arts in Islamic studies.

The following certificates are issued by the Institute:

Certificate of Hafiz-ul-Qur'an (memorizing the Noble Qur'an)
Certificate of Secondary (Equivalent Matriculation)
Certificate of Higher Secondary  (Equivalent FA)
Certificate of Higher Education  (Equivalent Bachelor of Arts in Arabic)
Certificate of Dars-i Nizami (Equivalent M.A in Islamic studies)

Campus

The institute has a large campus with modern facilities, including a mosque, classrooms, library, computer lab, and residential facilities for students.

The campus is located north east of Hill Side Road in Sector E7 of Islamabad, around 1.5 km east of Faisal Mosque, and at the foothills of the Margalla Hills, the westernmost foothills of the Himalayas, putting it at the northernmost end of the city, It is located on an elevated area of land against a picturesque backdrop of the Margalla Hills National Park, it is easily accessible and located in a peaceful and serene environment, the area is known for its well-maintained infrastructure, lush greenery, making it an ideal place for a educational institution.

The campus has been divided into four sections, each named after one of the four Rashidun caliphs.

Jamia Mosque

Historically before the construction of the institute, an old mosque named Toobah Mosque was constructed by nearby village residents. However, the mosque was later incorporated into the institute and was expanded into a Jamia Mosque which was later re-named to Jamia Masjid Abdullah Ghazi Shaheed.

The Al Faridia High School 
The Al Faridia High School is a public high school which offers students classes from 7th till the matriculation, and was established by Maulana Abdul Rashid Ghazi.

Library

Named after the renowned intellectual center in Baghdad during the Islamic Golden Age, the Bayt al-Ḥikmah Library is situated across from the main building. The library boasts an impressive collection of over three thousand books and journals, including the complete 32-volume set of Encyclopædia Britannica.

Maktaba Faridia

Maktaba Faridia is a bookstore and publisher that is a subsidiary company of Jamia Faridia. It was founded in 1982 to help students get their academic books and other accessories.

AQ Khan Forest Trail

In 2002, the institute constructed a pedestrian path from the institute to Faisal Mosque. It was constructed with the financial assistance of Pakistani Scientist Dr. Abdul Qadeer Khan, and was therefore named the AQ Khan Trail.

See also
 Jamia Hafsa
Lal Masjid

References

External links 
Official website
Faridia University at Instagram
Faridia University at YouTube

References
Islamic universities and colleges

Deobandi Islamic universities and colleges
1971 establishments in Pakistan
Educational institutions established in 1971
Islam in Pakistan
Madrasas in Pakistan
Universities and colleges in Islamabad